Jessica's Law is the informal name given to a 2005 Florida law, as well as laws in several other states, designed to protect potential victims and reduce a sexual offender's ability to re-offend.  A version of Jessica's Law, known as the Jessica Lunsford Act, was introduced at the federal level in 2005 but was never enacted into law by Congress.

The name is also used by the media to designate all legislation and potential legislation in other states modeled after the Florida law.  Forty-two states have introduced such legislation since Florida's law was passed.

The law is named after Jessica Lunsford, a young Florida girl who was kidnapped, raped, and murdered in February 2005 by John Couey, a previously convicted sex offender.  Public outrage over this case spurred Florida officials to introduce this legislation.  Among the key provisions of the law was classifying lewd or lascivious molestation on a person under the age of 12 as a life felony, and a mandatory minimum sentence of 25 years in prison and lifetime electronic monitoring of persons 18 and older convicted of lewd or lascivious molestation against a victim less than 12 years old. Lewd or lascivious molestation is defined as "A person who intentionally touches in a lewd or lascivious manner the breasts, genitals, genital area, or buttocks, or the clothing covering them,... or forces or entices a person  to so touch the perpetrator." The statute also requires that if an offender is sentenced to a term of years, he or she must be given lifetime probation following the imprisonment. In Florida, another charge, capital sexual battery  is defined as: A person 18 years of age or older who commits sexual battery upon, or in an attempt to commit sexual battery injures the sexual organs of, a person less than 12 years of age commits a capital felony. Sexual battery is defined as oral, anal, or vaginal penetration by, or union with, the sexual organ of another or the anal or vaginal penetration of another by any other object, except for bona fide medical purposes. The charge of capital sexual battery carries a mandatory  sentence of life in prison without parole.

Jessica Lunsford Act
The Jessica Lunsford Act ( of the 109th Congress), was a proposed federal law in the United States — modeled after the Florida state law — which, if adopted, would have mandated more stringent tracking of released sex offenders.

Bill objectives
The bill, if passed, would have greatly reduced federal grant money under the Violent Crime Control and Law Enforcement Act of 1994 and Omnibus Crime Control and Safe Streets Act of 1968 to any U.S. State that failed to conform its sex offender registration laws to the following:

Sex offenders would have been required to wear Global Positioning System devices on their ankles for five years following their release from prison, or for life for those deemed sexual predators, to better enable law enforcement personnel to track their whereabouts. The costs of tracking and monitoring offenders would have been absorbed by each State.
States would have been required to mail sex offender registration forms at least twice per year, at random times, to verify registrants' addresses. Any registrants who did not respond within 10 days would have to be considered non-compliant.

The bill was introduced by U.S. Republican Congresswoman Ginny Brown-Waite from Florida on April 6, 2005.  It had 107 cosponsors and was referred to a subcommittee of the House Judiciary Committee, but it was never voted upon (either by any committee or the full Congress), and it died when the 109th Congress finally adjourned.

Impact on offender's family members
Advocates for convicted sex offenders claim that the civil rights of convicted persons and their non-offending family members is forever affected, long after the punishment has ended.  Internet publication of sex offenders' home addresses continues to be upheld by the court in the name of public safety, although a series of vigilante-type murders in Maine in April 2006 have brought new concerns of misuse of the registry and for the safety of non-offending family members by private parties. Missouri civil rights attorney Arthur Benson currently awaits a decision from the Missouri Supreme Court regarding the Sex Offenders Registration and Notification Act (SORNA) litigation, Jane Doe I, et al. v. Thomas Phillips et al. which "contends the act violates substantive due process rights and equal protection rights because it infringes on fundamental liberty rights, imposes a lifetime stigma, has no express purpose and, even if it serves a compelling interest, is not narrowly tailored or rationally related to that interest. They assert that, if the act is deemed to be criminal in nature, it violates the prohibition against ex post facto laws because it imposes an additional punishment, thereby altering the consequences for a crime for which they already have been sentenced."

See also
California Proposition 83 (2006)
Penile plethysmograph
Megan's Law
Sarah's Law
Clare's Law

References

Arthur A. Benson II.  Jane Doe I, et al. v. Thomas Phillips et al. (Case No. SC86573). May 2006.
Carl Jones. "Porn Law Goes Too Far". Daily Business Review. April 10, 2006.
Internet Broadcasting Systems and Local6.com. "Groups Propose Tier System For Sex Registry".  May 2006.
Rebecca Van Drunen. Confederation College. "Outcast Society: A Closer Look at North American Sexual Offenders in the Twenty-First Century". May 5, 2006.
Sharon Wilson. "Sex Offenders: The Other Side". Orlando Sentinel. 23 October 2005.

External links
Full text of the bill: 
Florida House Bill 1877 The text of the enrolled version of Jessica's Law passed in Florida.
Jessie's Dad

United States proposed federal criminal legislation
Sex laws
Sex offender registration
Proposed legislation of the 109th United States Congress
Sex offender registries in the United States
Florida law